Clavatula martensi is a species of sea snail, a marine gastropod mollusk in the family Clavatulidae.

Description
The shell grows to a length of 31 mm.

Distribution
This species occurs in the Atlantic Ocean off Angola.

References

 Martens E.C. von, 1881: Conch. Mittheil., 107, t. 21, f. 5–9.

External links
 
 A study on the true identity of Clavatula martensi von Maltzan, 1883 (Mollusca: Gastropoda: Clavatulidae) resulting in the description of a new species, Clavatula matthiasi; Neptunea 7 (1), January 2008

Endemic fauna of Angola
martensi
Gastropods described in 1883